Sweet Nothin's is a 1959 song by Brenda Lee written by Ronnie Self. It peaked at No. 4 on the Billboard Hot 100 and No. 12 on the Hot R&B Sides chart, in 1960. The song (as Sweet Nuthin's) also charted on the UK Singles Chart in 1960, peaking at No. 4, marking Lee's first appearance on the UK chart.

Musician and producer David Z adapted Brenda's vocals in this song to produce the distinctive backing vocals in "Kiss", the smash hit for Prince. Lee's voice from "Sweet Nothin's" was sampled in Kanye West's song "Bound 2" on his 2013 album Yeezus, which in turn was sampled by Sigma in their 2014 song, "Nobody to Love", which also uses the same vocal sample from "Sweet Nothin's" as "Bound 2" does.

In popular culture
The song was used in a 1985 TV commercial for Molson Canadian beer in Canada.

References

1959 singles
Brenda Lee songs
1959 songs
Rockabilly songs
Songs written by Ronnie Self